SM U-110 was a Type U 93
U-boat of the German Imperial Navy during World War I.
She was ordered on 5 May 1916 and launched on 28 July 1917. She was commissioned on 25 September 1917 as SM U-110. and assigned to IV Flotilla of the High Seas Fleet, based on the German North Sea coast.

Service history
U-110 made three wartime patrols, and sank 10 ships, totalling . Her first success was the British Q ship , with which she fought an engagement on 24 December 1917. Penshurst sank shortly after.

Fate
She was found and depth-charged by British destroyers Michael and Moresby. 39 men were lost.

In September 1918, she was raised and taken to Swan Hunter's dry dock for restoration. At the conclusion of hostilities, restoration was halted and she was sold for scrap.

Summary of raiding history

Notes

References

Bibliography

Kemp, Paul : U-Boats Destroyed  (1997). 
Tarrant, VE : The U-Boat Offensive 1914–1945 (1989)

External links

World War I submarines of Germany
German Type U 93 submarines
1917 ships
Ships built in Kiel
U-boats commissioned in 1917
Maritime incidents in 1918
U-boats sunk in 1918
U-boats sunk by British warships
U-boats sunk by depth charges